The F. E. Bowman Apartments is a historic apartment building located in the Irvington neighborhood of Portland, Oregon, United States. Constructed in 1913, it is one of the oldest apartment buildings in Irvington, and the best preserved from its era. Through its Craftsman styling, builder Frederic E. Bowman gave attention to blending the building into the neighborhood of pre-existing single-family homes. It is one of several apartment buildings of similar scale and/or style that Bowman added to Portland's urban landscape through his career.

The building was placed on the National Register of Historic Places in 1989.

See also
National Register of Historic Places listings in Northeast Portland, Oregon
Irvington Bowman Apartments

References

External links

Oregon Historic Sites Database entry

Residential buildings completed in 1913
1913 establishments in Oregon
Neoclassical architecture in Oregon
Apartment buildings on the National Register of Historic Places in Portland, Oregon
Irvington, Portland, Oregon